(Wm; German for 'master-sentinel' or 'watch-master') is a military rank of non-commissioned officers (NCO) in Austria and Switzerland. The  was initially responsible for the guard duty of the army. Later, it became the  equivalent NCO-grade of the cavalry and artillery. Besides Austria and Switzerland today, the rank was also used elsewhere, for example in Germany, Russia, and Poland (wachmistrz).

In the German police service, Wachtmeister denoted the lowest rank; it was abolished in the 1980s, but is still the colloquial term referring to police patrolling in uniform.

Historical background 
The Wachtmeister was in the beginning responsible guard, sentry, or sentinel, responsible for the armies' guard duty. Later he became the Feldwebel equivalent NCO-grade of the cavalry and artillery.

In the Landsknecht armies and in the town of the 16th century, Wachtmeister was the official title to a «war experienced, skilful, and honest fellow», which was – in line to the order of his superior – responsible for the security of the military compound, or/and had to take care for the marching troops. He organized and controlled the guards, was responsible for discipline and attention, and took care for knowing the watchword. The watch service was provided almost by the cavalry, and often the mounted troops were responsible to guard the whole army, what was the case for instance in Brandenburg about 1620.

With the formation of standing armies, the designation Wachtmeister became of universally valid for the Feldwebel of the cavalry, later also of the artillery and other armed service branches. As regards to the three Feldwebel-ranks until 1945 there were the equivalent ranks Unterwachtmeister, Wachtmeister and Oberwachtmeister. Until 1970 in the GDR NPA the Feldwebel of the artillery was designated Wachtmeister.

Austria 

Until the 1970s year the artillery and air defence troops used the designation Feuerwerker instead of Wachtmeister. Today, the Wachtmeister is the lowest NCO-rank (assignment group M BUO 2 / professional NCO; respectively M ZUO 2 / longer-serving volunteer) in the Austrian Bundesheer. The Wachtmeister will normally be deployed as a leader (Austrian: Kommandant) of a squad (8 to 13 soldiers).

Regarding the promotion to the rank there are three possibilities:
First: to pass (successfully) the one year NCO-course on the Heeresunteroffiziersakademie (HUAk) of the Bundesheer in Enns
Second: by finishing / at the end of the so-called make good training (de: Nachholausbildung)
Third: by finishing the first part of the officers' training programme.

Austro-Hungarian Armed Forces 
Wachtmeister was a cavalry rank of the Austro-Hungarian Armed Forces (1867–1918). It was comparable to Cavalry Mster-sergeant in Anglophone armed forces.

In the Austro-Hungarian Armed Forces Wachtmeister was equivalent to:
Beschlagmeister I. Klasse (Master-Blacksmith 1st class) cavalry,
Feldwebel (en: Master-sergeant) infantry,
Feuerwerker (Master-sergeant) artillery,
Oberjaeger (Master-Sergeant) of the mountain troops,
Rechnungs-Unteroffizier I. Klasse (Fiscal master-sergeant 1st class),
Regimentshornist (Regiment bugler),
Regimentstambour (Regiment drummer),
Waffenmeister I. Klasse (Weapon master 1st class) artillery and weapon arsenal,
Einjährig-Freiwilliger-Feldwebel (Feldwebel – volunteer serving one year), and
Kadett-Feldwebel (Officers-Aspirant).

Then rank insignia was a gorget patch on the stand-up collar of the so-called Waffenrock (en: tunic), and consisted of three white stars on 13 mm ragged yellow silk galloon. The gorget patch and the stand-up collar showed the particular Waffenfarbe (en: corps colour).

Examples (selection)

Germany 
Similarly to the company sergeant major appointment to army units (de: Kompaniefeldwebel / popularly: Spiess), the NCOs with port épée on board larger warships wears the designation «Wachtmeister». Among other responsibilities, he might be required to deal with S1 (coordinating staff area – personnel service) obligations. Assigned to this role will be experienced port épée NCOs up to the rank of Hauptbootsmann (OR7) or higher.

In the German army ground forces, the designation of the Feldwebel rank of Cavalry and Artillery was the «Wachtmeister» until 1945.

In the GDR National People´s Army (NPA), the «Wachtmeister» was replaced by Feldwebel in 1970.

In the Imperial German Navy, Reichsmarine, and Kriegsmarine, the lowest port épée NCO rank of the sea operations divisions was named «Wachtmeister» as well. However, the equivalent rank of land operations divisions was named Feldwebel.

National People's Army 
In the GDR National People's Army (NPA) the «Wachtmeister» was replaced by the universal rank designation Feldwebel. The equivalent rank of the Volksmarine (en: People's Navy) was the Meister of the Volksmarine.

Poland 
In Poland, "Wachmistrz" was a sergeant serving in cavalry.

Russia 

To the Russian Army «Wachtmeisterr» (ru: Ва́хмистр / Vakhmistr) was already adopted in 1711, as to the order of the Tsar Peter the Great. Until 1877 there were unofficially also the ranks «Starshij vakhmistr» (ru: Старший ва́хмистр) and «Mladshij vakhmistr» (ru: Младший ва́хмистр) in order to provide a discrimination to the so-called platoon NCOs (ru: Vsvodnji unter-officer).

The «Wachtmeister» was responsible for providing support to the troop commander, which normally was Rittmeister (cavalry captain OF2-rank). To his duty responsibilities counted among others basic unit training, command task training, service support, and internal disposition.

The equivalent to «Wachtmeister» was the Feldwebel of the infantry. Until 1826 it was the highs NCO-rank and superior to all subordinate NCOs. In 1826 the so-called «old» Oberwachtmeisters were counted to the senior officer´s rank group in, line to the Russian rank table (XIV, before XIII). However, in real life it was never accepted, although id could be army internal equal treated to the cornet rank.

Switzerland 

In the Military of Switzerland the Wachtmeister (Wm, sergent, sergente) is a NCO-rank. The rank is higher than the rank Korporal, and lower the Oberwachtmeister.

Until the so-called Army reform XXI (with effect from 1 January 2004) the rank was regular assigned to Zugführer -Stellvertreter (en: deputy platoon leader). However, in 2014 the new Wachtmeister appointment was squad leader or vehicle leader (de: Gruppenführer, Wagenkommandant), e.g. gun commander (de: Geschützführer).

In United Nations missions and in NATO Partnership for Peace the rank Wachtmeister will be designated in English with Sergeant (Sgt).

References 

 Die Streitkräfte der Republik Österreich, 1918-1968, Heeresgeschichtliches Museum, Militärwissenschaftliches Institut, 1968.

Military ranks of Austria
Military ranks of Switzerland
Austro-Hungarian Army
Military ranks of Germany
Military ranks of Russia